The San Pablo City Science Integrated High School (Mataas na Paaralang Pang-Agham ng Lungsod ng San Pablo) is a Secondary Public Science High School system located in  San Pablo City, Laguna, Philippines with address DLSP Campus, Brgy. San Jose, San Pablo City, Laguna.  It is a DepEd-recognized science high school.

Due to the influx of applicants of Grade 7 students back in 2020, the number of sections increased by then. As of now, the Grade 7 Sections for the academic school year 2022-2023 are:
Grade 7 Del Mundo, Grade 7 Quisumbing, Grade 7 Zara, and Grade 7 Banzon.

Meanwhile, the sections back in the previous years of 2019-2020 and beyond were:
Grade 7 Galilei, Grade 7 Copernicus, and Grade 7 Pascal.

Science high schools in the Philippines
Schools in San Pablo, Laguna
High schools in Laguna (province)